An All-Star Tribute to Brian Wilson was a tribute concert held at New York City's famed Radio City Music Hall on March 29, 2001 that TNT presented on July 4, 2001.

Setlist
Chazz Palminteri hosted the show and Cameron Crowe, Dennis Hopper, Rachel Hunter, and Sir George Martin spoke on behalf of Brian Wilson's life and musical success. The following songs are only those included on the DVD: in all a total of 34 titles were performed, including songs from Pet Sounds.

On the DVD, there's a bonus track: "Do It Again" by Brian Wilson. It was written by Mike Love and Brian Wilson.

References

External links
 IMDB - Full Cast, Crew, and Performers

Tribute concerts in the United States
Albums recorded at Radio City Music Hall
Brian Wilson
2001 in New York City
2001 in American music
Musical tributes to the Beach Boys